BARK was an early electromechanical computer. BARK was built using standard telephone relays, implementing a 32-bit binary machine. It could perform addition in 150 ms and multiplication in 250 ms. It had a memory with 50 registers and 100 constants. It was later expanded to double the memory. Howard Aiken stated in reference to BARK "This is the first computer I have seen outside Harvard that actually works."

History 
BARK was developed by Matematikmaskinnämnden (Swedish Board for Computing Machinery) a few years before BESK. The machine was built with 8,000 standard telephone relays, 80 km of cable and with 175,000 soldering points. Programming was done by plugboard. It was completed in February 1950 at a cost of 400,000 Swedish kronor (less than $100,000), became operational on April 28th 1950 and was taken offline on September 22nd 1954. The engineers on the team led by Conny Palm were Harry Freese, Gösta Neovius, Olle Karlqvist, Carl-Erik Fröberg, G. Kellberg, Björn Lind, Arne Lindberger, P. Petersson and Madeline Wallmark.

See also 
 BESK - Binär Elektronisk Sekvens-Kalkylator - Sweden's second computer.
 Elsa-Karin Boestad-Nilsson, a programmer on BARK and BESK
 SMIL - SifferMaskinen I Lund (The Number Machine in Lund)
 History of computing hardware

References

External links 
 Tekn. lic. Olle Karlqvist in memoriam (in Swedish), Google translation, memorial site of one of the engineers behind BARK and BESK. On BARK page there's a technical pdf document (in English): The BARK, A Swedish General Purpose Relay Computer

One-of-a-kind computers
Electro-mechanical computers
Science and technology in Sweden